Esma Voloder is a Bosnian-Australian actress, model and beauty pageant titleholder who was crowned Miss World Australia 2017 and represented Australia at the Miss World 2017 pageant.

Pageantry

Miss Supranational 2013
Voloder represented Australia at Miss Supranational 2013 in Poland and ended up as a Top 10 semi-finalist.

Miss Globe International 2014
Voloder has been crowned as Miss Globe International 2014 at the conclusion of the finals held on September 14, 2014, at Baku Crystal Hall, in the city of Baku, Azerbaijan.

Miss World Australia 2017
Voloder was crowned Miss World Australia 2017 and competed at Miss World 2017 in Sanya, China, but failed to place in the semifinals, ending Australia's six-year streak of consecutive placements in Miss World, from 2011 through 2016.

Personal life
Voloder was born in a refugee camp after her parents escaped the Bosnian War. The family then relocated to Australia. She has gone on to earn a degree in psychology and is currently working as a criminal profiler in Melbourne.

Voloder is a Muslim.

Career 
Voloder is a model, host, TV presenter, and is involved in international and Australian brand/label promotion

References

External links

Year of birth missing (living people)
Living people
Australian beauty pageant winners
Australian Muslims
Australian people of Bosnia and Herzegovina descent
Miss World 2017 delegates
Australian people of Bosniak descent